The Gumpathon was a run across the United States undertaken by five British and one American servicemen to raise money for wounded veterans.  The 3,530 mile journey began in New York City on September 10, 2010 and ended at the Santa Monica pier eight weeks later on November 11, Veterans Day / Remembrance Day.

Runners
 CSgt Damian Todd RM
 Mark Ormrod
 Master Gunnery Sergeant Charles "Chunks" Padilla USMC
 Marine Jamie Jobson
 Cpl Lloyd Fenner RM
 SSgt James Mazzoni-Dalton Army Physical Training Corps

References

External links
 The Gumpathon | HELP for HEROES and the US Injured Marine Semper Fi Fund Charity Trek

Charity events in the United States